Ophiuchus is a constellation.

Ophiuchus may also refer to:
Ophiuchus Supercluster, a supercluster of galaxies
Ophiuchus (astrology), sometimes  used in sidereal astrology as a thirteenth constellation
Ophiuchus (band), a folk roots rock group from Castle Combe, Wiltshire, England
Ophiuchus Shaina, a manga character